Hrušica may refer to a number of places in Slovenia:
 Hrušica, Jesenice, a settlement 3 km west of Jesenice
 Hrušica, Ilirska Bistrica, a village northwest of Podgrad
 Hrušica, Novo Mesto, a settlement in the foothills of the Gorjanci
 Hrušica, a hamlet of Podkraj, Ajdovščina in the Municipality of Ajdovščina
 Hrušica (plateau), a limestone plateau
 Hrušica Peak